Salford is an urban settlement within the metropolitan borough of Salford, in Greater Manchester, England (formerly in Lancashire).

Salford  may also refer to:

In Greater Manchester 
 The City of Salford, a metropolitan borough of Greater Manchester, containing the settlement, currently holding city status
 Salford (speedway), a motorcycle racing team from Salford, Greater Manchester
 Salford (UK Parliament constituency), an electoral area of North West England established in 1997, and represented in the United Kingdom's House of Commons
 Salford City F.C., an association football club based in the city
 The County Borough of Salford, a former city and local government district located within the administrative county of Lancashire, England
 Hundred of Salford, also known as Salfordshire, an ancient judicial division of Lancashire, England
 Roman Catholic Diocese of Salford

Other places named Salford 
Salford, Bedfordshire, a village near Milton Keynes, South East England
Salford, Ontario, a locality within South-West Oxford, Ontario, a township in Canada
Salford, Oxfordshire, a village in South East England
Salford, Pennsylvania, United States
Salford Township, Montgomery County, Pennsylvania, a township in the United States
Salfords, a village in Surrey, South East England
Salford Priors, a village on the Warwickshire/Worcestershire border
Salford, West Yorkshire, an area in the town of Todmorden

See also 
 Salford Central (disambiguation)